The Treasurer of the State of Colorado is one of the five elected officials of the U.S. state of Colorado, the other four being the Governor, Lieutenant Governor, Secretary of State and Attorney General. The State Treasurer is responsible for managing the Colorado State Treasury and the Colorado Department of the Treasury, a principal department of the Colorado state government. The Colorado State Treasury currently manages a pool of investments worth about $6,000,000,000.

The current Colorado State Treasurer, Dave Young, was elected on November 8, 2018, for a four-year term beginning on January 8, 2019.

List of Colorado Treasurers

See also

State of Colorado
Law and Government of Colorado

External links
Colorado Department of the Treasury
Treasurer of the State of Colorado